is a former Japanese cyclist. He competed in the 1000m time trial event at the 1972 Summer Olympics. He was also a professional keirin cyclist.

References

External links
 

1951 births
Living people
Japanese male cyclists
Olympic cyclists of Japan
Cyclists at the 1972 Summer Olympics
Place of birth missing (living people)
Asian Games medalists in cycling
Cyclists at the 1970 Asian Games
Medalists at the 1970 Asian Games
Asian Games gold medalists for Japan
Keirin cyclists